Swinsto Cave is a limestone cave in West Kingsdale, North Yorkshire, England. It leads into Kingsdale Master Cave and it is popular with cavers as it is possible to descend by abseiling down the pitches, retrieving the rope each time, and exiting through Valley Entrance of Kingsdale Master Cave at the base of the hill.

Description

The entrance is in a shakehole, and enters a small active stream passage. This soon enlarges to walking size before reaching a  pitch with water entering from one side. Below this a succession of three pitches rapidly descends to a spray-lashed chamber. At the end of this an excavated rift leads up into McShea Chamber in Turbary Pot, an alternative entrance. The main passage continues, descending a number of cascades and a further two small pitches, before entering a larger area where the water from Simpson Pot enters from on high on the left. Kingsdale Master Cave can be reached from two different passages. On the true left of the waterfall a descent through boulders leads into Philosopher's Crawl, and on the other side of the chamber a climb down over boulders leads into East Entrance Passage.

Geology and hydrology

Swinsto Cave is a karst cave formed within the Great Scar Limestone Group of the Visean Stage of the Carboniferous Period, laid down about 335 Ma. It takes the water of Swinsto Hole Syke, and is a tributary into the West Kingsdale Master Cave System, combining with water from Simpson Pot, Rowten Cave, Bull Pot, and Yordas Cave to eventually resurges at Keld Head – a kilometre or so to the south. It is considered to be a classic example of a down-dip vadose cave descending in steps to a phreas. The upper passages follow bedding planes dipping gently towards the north until an area of joints is intercepted, where the cave descends rapidly down a series of shafts. At a level of about  the passage intercepts an older phreatic system, within which the stream has incised a vadose canyon. Both Swinsto Great Aven and Swinsto Final Chamber are formed on minor faults.

History
The first mention of the cave is by Balderstone in Ingleton Bygone and Present, published in 1890, where he accurately describes how it is  possible to traverse the cave for 33 yards before encountering "a deep wide hole, with high vaulted roof, fine cone-like stalactites, and waterfall thirty feet high". In 1908 a party from the Yorkshire Ramblers Club descended the pitch and explored the way on for about  before turning back when the route ahead became low and wet. The baton was not picked up for over 20 years, but in 1930 a party from the Gritstone Club finally reached the bottom after a long siege lasting a year and many trips, the key to their success being the lowering of water levels in The Long Crawl. Simpson Pot was explored through to Swinsto Cave in 1948 by members of the British Speleological Association. Turbary Inlet was first explored by a party from the University of Leeds Speleological Association (ULSA) in 1962, and the connection made with Turbary Pot by Andy Jones, Darren McKenzie and Dave Ramsay in 2020. The route to Kingsdale Master Cave was first entered in November 1965 when a party from ULSA dug out a choke in Final Chamber, into what became known as Philosopher's Crawl.

Michael Midgley died when descending the cave after falling  down a pitch on 9th September 1971.

References

External links
Online surveys of Swinsto Cave
Rigging guide for Swinsto Cave

Caves of North Yorkshire
Limestone caves